The Fruit Company is an American company that was founded in 1942 by Roy Webster. The company, still privately owned and led by CEO Scott Webster, has become known for their "classic baskets and gift towers featuring Northwest-grown pears and apples". The company also provides support to college students through "The Roy Webster Scholarship" and "The Fruit Company Gift Basket Entrepreneur Award".

History
Roy Webster, who had once toured the Hood River Valley on honeymoon, came to the area in 1942 and acquired  of land. The company, then named Webster Orchards, originally specialized in Comice pears and, in the following years, began running a mail order service to distribute their signature pears across the Pacific Northwest.

The company eventually passed to Roy Webster's son, Wayne Webster, who then passed the company to sons Scott and Addison Webster in 1999. Under the management of the Webster brothers, Webster Orchards became The Fruit Company and began selling fruit under "The World's Finest Fruit" trademark. In 1986, the Webster brothers purchased the Diamond Fruit packing warehouse to establish the Fruit Company's permanent headquarters. Scott Webster is currently the company's CEO, and President of Roy Webster Orchards Incorporated.

The company saw a period of financial hardship during the Great Recession and was forced to lay off 30% of its employees and make other cutbacks. However, after overhauling their cost structure and earning the support of Costco as one of their primary fruit basket suppliers, the company resumed its growth.

The Fruit Company is also a part of Hood River County's famous "Fruit Loop", a driving tour that stops at family farms and fruit stands.

Awards and accolades
The company has been recognized by various organizations and publications throughout the years. The company was selected by O, The Oprah Magazine to be part of their "Holiday O List" in 2003. In 2005, The Fruit Company was named one of the "Top 50 Best of the Web" for online retailing websites by Internet Retailer Magazine, and in 2013, Los Angeles news outlet KTLA praised The Fruit Company for their Mother's Day gift baskets on the air. The company has also been named one of Oregon's top 15 companies.

See also
 List of companies based in Oregon
 Pine Grove, Hood River County, Oregon

References

External links
 The Fruit Company

Companies based in Hood River, Oregon
Retail companies of the United States
Privately held companies based in Oregon
Mail-order retailers
American companies established in 1942
1942 establishments in Oregon
Food and drink companies established in 1942